John Francis Isaac Pratt (30 June 1913 – 3 March 1992) was an Anglican priest.

He was born in Bradford-on-Avon, Wiltshire, and educated at Keble College, Oxford. He was ordained in 1937. He held incumbencies in Rastrick, Wendover and Reading before becoming Archdeacon of Buckingham. In 1970, he became Provost of Southwell Minster.

References

1913 births
1992 deaths
Alumni of Keble College, Oxford
Archdeacons of Buckingham
Provosts and Deans of Southwell